This article lists fellows of the Royal Society who were elected in 2014.  For the first time, most fellows portraits are available on Wikimedia Commons, published by the Royal Society under a Creative Commons Attribution-Share-alike (CC BY-SA) license.

Fellows of the Royal Society (FRS)

Professor Steven Armes FRS
Professor Paul Attfield FRS
Professor David Beerling FRS
Professor Michael Benton FRS
Lord Sushantha Bhattacharyya KB CBE FREng FRS
Dr Ewan Birney FRS
Professor Dorothy Bishop FRS FBA FMedSci 
Professor Tom Bridgeland FRS
Professor David Charlton FRS
Professor Peter Colman FRS
Professor Steven Cowley FRS
Dame Sally Davies DBE FRS
Professor Marian Dawkins CBE FRS
Dr John Dick FRS
Professor Liam Dolan FRS
Professor Timothy Eglinton FRS
Professor Amanda Fisher FRS
Professor Geoffrey Grimmett FRS
Professor Martin Hairer FRS
Professor Richard Edwin Hills FRS
Dr Timothy Holland FRS
Professor Martin Johnson FMedSci FRS
Professor Peter Keightley FRS
Mr Mike Lazaridis OC FRS
Professor Timothy Leighton FREng FRS
Professor Simon Lilly FRS
Dr Michael Lynch OBE FREng FRS
Dr Andrew Mackenzie FRS
Professor Vladimir Markovic FRS
Professor Irwin McLean FMedSci FRS
Professor Paul Midgley FRS
Professor Gareth Morris FRS
Professor James Naismith FMedSci FRS
Professor Jenny Nelson FRS
Professor Colin Nichols FRS
Professor Miles Padgett FRS
Dr Julian Parkhill FMedSci FRS
Dr Karalyn Patterson FMedSci FRS
Professor Sheena Radford FMedSci FRS
Professor Randy Read FRS
Professor David Ron FMedSci FRS
Professor Patrik Rorsman FMedSci FRS
Professor Bill Rutherford FRS
Mr Colin Smith CBE FREng FRS
Dr Alan Soper FRS
Lord Nicholas Stern Kt FBA FRS
Professor Nicholas Talbot FRS
Professor Demetri Terzopoulos FRS 
Professor Rajesh Thakker FRS
Professor Anthony Watts FRS

Foreign members
Professor Richard Alley ForMemRS
Professor Richard Axel ForMemRS
Professor Chunli Bai ForMemRS
Professor Steven Chu ForMemRS
Professor Stephen Harrison ForMemRS
Professor Vincent Poor FREng ForMemRS
Professor Philippe Sansonetti ForMemRS
Professor Joan Steitz ForMemRS
Professor Clifford Tabin ForMemRS
Professor Jean-Marie Tarascon ForMemRS

References
       

2014
2014 in the United Kingdom
2014 in science